The King Abdulaziz Naval Base (Arabic: قاعدة الملك عبد العزيز البحرية) (KANB) is a naval base in Al-Sharqiyah, Eastern Province, Saudi Arabia. It is operated by the Saudi Arabian Navy. It is home to the Eastern Fleet and the Royal Naval Academy. Their Navy Ratings "SK" (Storekeeper) and "YN" (Yeoman) learned basic skills in this school.

RSNF's Western Province counterpart is in Jeddah. It is King Faisal Naval Base (KFNB). King Fahd Naval Academy is located inside this base.

References

See also

 List of things named after Saudi Kings
 List of military installations in Saudi Arabia

Base
Naval installations
Eastern Province, Saudi Arabia
Military installations of Saudi Arabia
Airports in Saudi Arabia